Maciej Majdziński (born 8 April 1996) is a Polish handball player for Bergischer HC and the Polish national team.

Career
He debuted on the national team on 7 November 2015, in a friendly match against Russia (27:21). He threw his first goal on 24 October 2018, in a match against Kosovo (37:13).

He represented Poland at the 2020 European Men's Handball Championship.

References

External links

 

1996 births
Living people
Polish male handball players
Expatriate handball players
Polish expatriate sportspeople in Germany
Handball-Bundesliga players
People from Kwidzyn
Bergischer HC players